This article contains the results of the Republic of Ireland women's national football team between 1973 and 1989. In 1973 the Women's Football Association of Ireland was established and the national team made their debut with a 3–2 win in an away game against Wales in the same year. The national team made their competitive debut on 19 September 1982 in a 1984 European Competition for Women's Football qualifier, also against Scotland. This time the Republic of Ireland lost 3–0. On 2 October 1982 the Republic of Ireland gained their first competitive win when they defeated Northern Ireland 2–1 in an away game in the same competition. During the 1980s the Republic of Ireland competed in three further qualifying campaigns – 1987, 1989 and 1991.

1973

1974

1976

1977

1978

1980

1981

1982

1983

1984

1985

1986

1987

1988

1989

References

External links 
Results at SoccerScene.ie

1973
1972–73 in Republic of Ireland association football
1973–74 in Republic of Ireland association football
1974–75 in Republic of Ireland association football
1975–76 in Republic of Ireland association football
1976–77 in Republic of Ireland association football
1977–78 in Republic of Ireland association football
1978–79 in Republic of Ireland association football
1979–80 in Republic of Ireland association football
1980–81 in Republic of Ireland association football
1981–82 in Republic of Ireland association football
1982–83 in Republic of Ireland association football
1983–84 in Republic of Ireland association football
1984–85 in Republic of Ireland association football
1985–86 in Republic of Ireland association football
1986–87 in Republic of Ireland association football
1987–88 in Republic of Ireland association football
1988–89 in Republic of Ireland association football
1989–90 in Republic of Ireland association football